Michael Schottenberg (born 10 July 1952) is an Austrian actor, film director and screenwriter. His film The Arrival of Averill was screened in the Un Certain Regard section at the 1992 Cannes Film Festival.

Selected filmography
 The Arrival of Averill (1992)
 The Piano Teacher (2001)

References

External links

1952 births
Living people
Austrian male film actors
Film people from Vienna
Male actors from Vienna